Kitimat Ranges - one of the three main subdivisions of the Coast Mountains in British Columbia, Canada
 Kitimat - a district municipality in the North Coast region of British Columbia
 Kitimat River - A river in British Columbia
 Regional District of Kitimat–Stikine - A district in British Columbia